Jules Eckert Goodman (November 2, 1876 – July 10, 1962) was an American playwright and author.  He was best known for his plays The Man Who Came Back (1916), The Silent Voice (1914), Chains (1923), and a series of plays featuring Potash and Permutter written with Montague Glass.

Life and career
Jules Eckert Goodman was born November 2, 1876 in Gervais, Oregon, one of six children born to S. Newman and Jenette ( Rothschild) Goodman. His family was Jewish, and his mother was a native of San Francisco, California. Prior to settling in Gervais and starting a family, Jeanette had resided in Portland's Multnomah Hotel.

Goodman received an undergraduate degree from Harvard University in 1899 and master's degree from Columbia University in 1901.  He was managing editor for four years of Current Literature and also wrote for Outing and the Dramatic Mirror.  He had his first success on Broadway with 1910's Mother.

The successful The Silent Voice (1914) (derived from a short story by Gouverneur Morris) was adapted to film four times; first in 1915, then again in 1922 under the title The Man Who Played God (the title of the original Morris story).   A talking-movie version also called The Man Who Played God appeared in 1932, starring George Arliss (who was also in the 1922 silent film) and Bette Davis, a role she credited as her big "break" in Hollywood.  Lastly, and least appealingly, it appeared as a campy 1955 star vehicle for Liberace called Sincerely Yours.

Among other film adaptions of Goodman's work, The Man Who Came Back appeared in 1931.  Goodman's reported last play Many Mansions (1937) was written with his son Eckert Goodman.

Goodman died of pneumonia in Peekskill, New York, where he had resided for forty years, on July 10, 1962.  His wife died in 1959, and he was survived by one son (Jules Eckert Goodman Jr., who died in 1964, aged 55), and two daughters, Helen Goodman and Anna Freedgood.

Selected bibliography

Plays
 The Man Who Stood Still (1908)
 The Right to Live (1908)
 The Test (1908)
 Mother (1910)
 The Point of View (1912)
 The Silent Voice (1914)
 The Trap (1915)
 Just Outside the Door (1915)
 Treasure Island (1915) (adaption of Robert Louis Stevenson novel)
 The Man Who Came Back (1916)
 Object - Matrimony (1916) (written with Montague Glass))
 Business Before Pleasure (1917) (written with Montague Glass)
 Why Worry? (1918)(written with Montague Glass)
 His Honor: Abe Potash (1919) (written with Montague Glass)
 Pietro (1920) (written with Maud Skinner)
 The Law Breaker (1922)
 Partners Again (1922) (written with Montague Glass) 
 Chains (1923)
 Simon Called Peter (1924) (written with Edward Knoblock)
 Potash and Permutter, Detectives (1926) (with Montague Glass)
 The Great Romancer (1937)
 Many Mansions (1937) (written with his son)
 George Worthing, American (debuted 1948, written earlier)

Novels
 Mother (1911) (adapted from the play)

References

External links
 
 
 

1876 births
1962 deaths
Writers from Oregon
People from Gervais, Oregon
Harvard University alumni
Columbia University alumni
Deaths from pneumonia in New York (state)
American dramatists and playwrights